Vidzy is an urban settlement in the Vitebsk Region, in Belarus.

History
During World War II, Vidzy was occupied by Nazi Germany from 27 June 1941 until 8 July 1944 and administered as a part of Generalbezirk Litauen of Reichskommissariat Ostland.

Notable people from Vidzy
 Iosif Bleikhman
 Cecilia Berdichevsky

References

External links
 

Braslaw District
Novoalexandrovsky Uyezd
Urban-type settlements in Belarus
Vilnius Voivodeship
Wilno Voivodeship (1926–1939)